= James McWashington =

American politician, farmer

James McWashington was a farmer and politician in Texas. Born in Alabama ca. 1840, he was enslaved. He was elected from Montgomery County, Texas as a delegate to the 1868-1869 Texas Constitutional Convention. He advocated for the legalization of marriages among slaves prior to emancipation and property rights for women. He opposed dividing Texas into two states and opposed chartering a railroad company that included former Confederates as stockholders. He ran for a seat in the state legislature but lost. He married and had at least nine children.

He was one of five black delegates at the 1868-1869 Texas Constitutional Convention. He proposed stripping voting rights and prohibiting from holding office those involved in duels. He opposed imprisoning debtors. Elizabeth McWashington was his wife.

He was one of 52 African American legislators who served during the Reconstruction era memorialized on a monument dedicated in 2010.
